Ballard's Green is a village in Warwickshire, England. Population details may be found under Over Whitacre.

Villages in Warwickshire